The following is a list of schools that operated as part of the Canadian Indian residential school system. The first opened in 1828, and the last closed in 1997. These schools operated in all Canadian provinces and territories except Prince Edward Island, and New Brunswick.

The Indian Residential School Settlement Agreement (IRSSA) has formally recognized 139 residential schools across Canada, but this number excludes schools that operated without federal support.

The last school to close was Kivalliq Hall in Rankin Inlet, in what's now Nunavut, which closed in 1997; it became a IRSSA-recognized school in 2019 following a court ruling, which is why earlier accounts describe the last school closing in 1996.

Schools in Newfoundland and Labrador were not included in the original settlement by the Harper government and instead reached a compensation deal with the federal government after a lawsuit in 2016.

List

See also

Canadian Indian residential school system
Indian Residential Schools Truth and Reconciliation Commission
Kamloops Indian Residential School
Marieval Indian Residential School
Lejac Residential School
New Zealand Native schools
Where the Spirit Lives - 1989 film about residential schools

Notes on terminology

References

External links
Official Residential School Settlement website
List of residential schools
Indian Residential Schools - Assembly of First Nations
Where are the children; Healing the Legacy of Residential Schools
National Centre for Truth and Reconciliation at the University of Manitoba

Indian residential
Residential schools
Canada